Kreis Hohensalza was one of many Kreise (districts) in the northern administrative region of Bromberg, in the Prussian province of Posen from 1815 to 1919. Its capital was Hohensalza (Inowrocław).

History 

Kreis Hohensalza ([ˌhoːənˈzalt͡sa], 1904–1919), known as Kreis Inowrazlaw until 1904, was a Kreis (district) in the northern administrative region of Bromberg, in the Prussian province of Posen. It was located within the Bromberg Government Region, first in the Grand Duchy of Posen (1815-1848, in personal union with Prussia) and then in the Prussian Province of Posen (1848-1919). On January 18, 1871, the Kreis, along with all of Prussia, became part of Germany. Kreis Hohensalza was part of the military command (German: Bezirkskommando) at Hohensalza (Inowrocław). The main regional court (German: Landgericht) was in Bromberg (Bydgoszcz), with a magistrate's court (German: Amtsgericht) in the capital city Hohensalza (Inowrocław).

On 1 July 1886 southern areas of the district were separated and became part of the new Kreis Strelno. The capital city, formerly known as Inowrazlaw, was renamed Hohensalza on 5 December 1904, and the county name also changed by default. In the course of the Greater Poland uprising in 1919, the southern part of the district came under Polish control, while the northern part with Argenau (Gniewkowo) remained under German control. Following the Treaty of Versailles in July 1919, Germany also ceded the northern part of the district to Poland between 17 January and 4 February 1920. The territory then became part of the Second Polish Republic.

During World War II, the territory of the former Kreis was annexed by Nazi Germany and Landkreis Hohensalza (Wartheland) was established, which existed from 1939 to 1945.

Demographics 
The district had a Polish majority population, with a significant German minority.

Geographical features

Table of Standesämter
"Standesamt" is the German name of the local / municipal civil registration offices which were established in October 1874 soon after the German Empire was formed. Births, marriages and deaths were recorded. Previously, only duplicate copies of church records were used. By 1905, Kreis Hohensalza had the following 15 offices for rural residents:

Amsee district was created in 1887 from Hohensalza district. Dziennitz district was created in 1890 from Lojewo district, Ostwehr district was created from Lojewo and Luisenfelde districts, and Schöngrund district was created from Gross Morin and Luisenfelde districts. Roneck district was created in 1905 from Argenau and Gross Wodek districts. In addition, the following cities were separate districts for urban residents: Hohensalza, Argenau.

Table of all communities

Notes

References

External links
 Wikipedia German page
 List of genealogical records
 Facsimiles of registration books

Navigation Bar 

This article is part of the project Wikipedia:WikiProject Prussian Kreise. Please refer to the project page, before making changes.

Grand Duchy of Posen
Districts of the Province of Posen
1871 establishments in Germany
1919 disestablishments in Germany
Districts of Prussia